The House of the First Printing Press in the Americas at the corner of Moneda and Licenciado Primo Verdad streets in Mexico City was the home of the first printing press/print shop in the New World. The printer Juan Pablos oversaw the printing of at least 35 books at this print shop between 1539, the date of the first book printed in the Americas, and his death in 1560.

The house was originally constructed by Gerónimo de Aguilar in 1524 and is located on the outer edge of what was the sacred precinct of the Templo Mayor prior to the Conquest.

After receiving permission from Spanish king Carlos V and the archbishop of Mexico City, Juan de Zumárraga had a printing press brought from Europe in 1539. The press was set up in this house, then called the "Casa de las Campanas" (House of the Bells) by the Seville-based publisher  with Italian printer Juan Pablos who worked for living expenses for ten years. They began printing viceregal- and Church-related documents. One of these documents was a catechism entitled Breve y más compendiosa doctrina christiana en lengua mexicana y castellana ("The Brief and Most Concise Christian Doctrine in the Mexican Language") written by the archbishop himself.

After its stint as a print shop, the house changed hands numerous times and was used for a number of purposes. In the 17th century, it belonged to the Monastery of Santa Teresa de la Orden de las Carmelas Reformadas and later, in the 18th century, it belonged to the Royal Military Order of Nuestra Señora de la Merced Redención de Cautivos de la Ciudad de México. In 1847, U.S. troops occupied the house, destroying the archives that were within. The house was then owned by a number of civilians, including one who used the building to store furniture. In the 20th century, the building was mostly used for offices, including being the home to a paper and printing services operation called the "Imprenta y Papelería Militar 'Marte'." The house continued to change hands until 1989, when the Universidad Autónoma Metropolitana (UAM) bought the house with the intention of restoring it.

UAM worked with the Historic Center Restoration Program, working with the Instituto Nacional de Antropología. About 82 cm below the surface of the ground floor the stone head of a serpent from Aztec times was discovered. It is possible that this head was visible to the occupants of the building in the 16th and 17th centuries.

Today, the house serves as the Continuing Education Center for UAM with various exhibition rooms, a bookstore and facilities for conferences and courses. In 2008, the Book Museum opened here, with some of the oldest books in Mexico on display.

References

External links
 

Houses completed in 1524
Museums in Mexico City
Printing press museums
Historic house museums in Mexico
Historic center of Mexico City
Landmarks in Mexico City
Buildings and structures in Mexico City
Museums established in 2008
History of Mexico City
Colonial Mexico
New Spain
1539 establishments in New Spain
2008 establishments in Mexico
Mexican culture
Spanish Colonial architecture in Mexico